Eduardo G. Risso Salaverría (25 February 1925 – 12 January 1986) was an Uruguayan rower, who represented his native country at the 1948 Summer Olympics in London, United Kingdom. There he won the silver medal in the men's single sculls event, behind Australia's Mervyn Wood. He also competed at the 1952 Summer Olympics.

References

External links
 

1925 births
1986 deaths
Rowers at the 1948 Summer Olympics
Rowers at the 1952 Summer Olympics
Olympic rowers of Uruguay
Olympic silver medalists for Uruguay
Place of birth missing
Olympic medalists in rowing
Medalists at the 1948 Summer Olympics
Uruguayan male rowers
20th-century Uruguayan people